Ladislav Jan Jetel (3 June 1886 – 24 September 1914) was a footballer who played as a midfielder.

Club career
During his playing career, Jetel played for Meteor Prague between 1905 and 1913.

International career
On 1 April 1906, Jetel made his debut for Bohemia in Bohemia's second game, starting in a 1–1 draw against Hungary. It was Jetel's only cap for Bohemia.

Death
On 24 September 1914, Jetel was killed in action in World War I in Parašnica, now in modern-day Serbia.

Notes

References

1886 births
1914 deaths
Austro-Hungarian military personnel killed in World War I
Footballers from Prague
Association football midfielders
Footballers from the Austro-Hungarian Empire
Bohemia international footballers